Dowrahan (also Romanized as Dowrāhān and Dorāhān; also known as Dow Rahūn and Durāhūn) is a village in Dowrahan Rural District, Gandoman District, Borujen County, Chaharmahal and Bakhtiari Province, Iran. At the 2006 census, its population was 829, in 215 families. The village is populated by Lurs.

References 

Populated places in Borujen County
Luri settlements in Chaharmahal and Bakhtiari Province